Operation Bite Back: Rod Coronado's War to Save American Wilderness is a 2009 book by Dean Kuipers on the activism of Rod Coronado.

Bibliography

External links 

 
 Full text from the Internet Archive
 Author's website

2009 non-fiction books
Bloomsbury Publishing books
Books about anarchism
Books about environmentalism
English-language books